Hayes Prison Farm, a former Australian minimum security prison for males, was established on land at Hayes, near New Norfolk, Tasmania. The facility was operated by the Tasmanian Prison Service, an agency of the Department of Justice of the Government of Tasmania. The facility was closed in late 2012.

Facilities
The original site consisted of an orchard, grazing land and a small forest. The prison was opened in 1937 and consisted of single wooden huts for 20 persons, built by prisoners. Another 50 single huts were built as numbers increased. A 50-cell block was built in 1968 and an extra block of 20 cells was built in 1970. The cell and administration buildings were replaced with concrete block construction in 1964 and are still in use today. At its peak, Hayes had large market vegetable gardens, 1,000 pigs, 1,800 laying hens, 2,000 sheep, an award-winning dairy herd and a clay processing plant that sold clay to Salamanca potters. Three truckloads packed with vegetables left the prison farm each week. Their customers included the Royal Derwent Hospital, Lachlan Park, the Royal Hobart and St John's hospitals, several nursing homes in the Hobart region, government departments and the prison itself. More than 300 cows are at Hayes. The farm is also responsible for a much smaller herd, which keeps the grass short at Government House in Hobart. Hayes sells 1.1 million litres of milk to dairy company National Foods each year.

The purpose of the farm is to assist inmates to develop skills to prepare them for exiting prison and to address recidivism.

In June 2011, it was announced that the Hayes Prison Farm will be decommissioned because of a 4.5 million repair bill. It is expected that the decommission process will take approximately 18 months. Prisoners would be moved to the recommissioned Ron Barwick facility at Risdon Prison. The decision to close Hayes was condemned by the State Opposition, unions and prisoner advocates. Should the closure proceed, Tasmania will be the only state that does not have a minimum security open facility. Government officials expect to yield up to A$2.5 million from the sale of Hayes.

In July 2011, three prisoners escaped in two separate incidents over three weeks, two of whom were caught within 24 hours.

The Tasmanian Government closed Hayes Prison Farm in August 2012 and moved all inmates to the minimum security Ron Barwick facility at Risdon Prison.

The property was sold to a private owner in January 2015.

Notable prisoners
James Ryan O'Neill

References

External links
Tasmanian Department of Justice: Prison Service – Facility contact details

1937 establishments in Australia
2012 disestablishments in Australia
Defunct prisons in Tasmania